Ryan Young (born June 28, 1976 in St. Louis, Missouri) is a former American football offensive tackle in the National Football League for the New York Jets, Houston Texans and Dallas Cowboys. He played college football at Kansas State University.

Early years
Young (nicknamed Big Marker), graduated from Parkway Central High School in Chesterfield, Missouri, in 1994. He played as a two-way tackle, receiving All-state and All-conference (twice) honors. He was a teammate of future NFL player Isaac Byrd. He practiced basketball and participated in the school's choir.

He accepted a football scholarship from Kansas State University, where he was named the starter at left tackle as a sophomore. He received All-Big 12 honors as a senior. He played in the Cotton, Fiesta and Alamo Bowls.

Professional career

New York Jets
Young was selected by the New York Jets in the seventh round (223rd overall) of the 1999 NFL Draft. He started the last seven games at right tackle as a rookie, after Jason Fabini was lost for the season. The next two years he was the regular starter at right tackle and helped to block for All-Pro running back Curtis Martin.

Houston Texans
Young was selected by the Houston Texans second overall in the 2002 NFL Expansion Draft. After playing in 48 straight games in his career, he suffered a torn muscle in his groin during training camp, missing most of the preseason and the first five games of the season. He also was limited in December with a knee injury. He appeared in nine games (eight starts) at right tackle. At the end of the year, he was declared a free agent and did not accept the Texans contract offer.

Dallas Cowboys
On March 5, 2003, he was signed as a free agent by the Dallas Cowboys, reuniting him with his former Jets head coach Bill Parcells. He began the season as the right tackle starter, but suffered a right knee injury that although the Cowboys tried to manage, after starting six of the first seven games, he would only appear in four additional games (two starts). On March 2, 2004, he was waived because of his chronic knee condition.

References

1976 births
Living people
Players of American football from St. Louis
American football offensive tackles
Kansas State Wildcats football players
New York Jets players
Houston Texans players
Dallas Cowboys players
Parkway Central High School alumni